Sculthorpe Training Area, previously RAF Sculthorpe is a training site owned by the British Ministry of Defence. It forms part of the Defence Training Estate.

The training area was the former Royal Air Force (RAF) Station Sculthorpe, which closed circa 1992. The airfield has been home to many visiting airmen and support crews of the RAF and United States Air Force (USAF). In 1997, the Ministry of Defence sold the entire technical, domestic and administrative site including the married quarters site previously occupied by the USAF to the Welbeck Estate Group. After the sale, the airfield was retained for military training usage.

History

Second World War
RAF Sculthorpe was built as the second satellite airfield of RAF West Raynham a few miles to the south, the first being RAF Great Massingham. The work involved construction of the concrete runways, dispersals site, mess facilities and accommodation. Much of the work was completed by Irish labour working for the company Bovis Construction.

As work was drawing to a close in May 1943 the first squadrons started to arrive. The first was No. 342 Squadron of the Free French Air Forces within No. 2 Group from RAF West Raynham. This squadron operated two flights of the Douglas Boston aircraft along with the related Douglas Havoc aircraft for training. No. 342 Squadron stayed until 19 July 1943 when they moved to RAF Great Massingham.

On 20 July 1943 the Royal New Zealand Air Force (RNZAF) and Royal Australian Air Force (RAAF) moved in with No. 487 Squadron RNZAF and No. 464 Squadron RAAF taking up residence with their Lockheed Ventura aircraft having moved from RAF Methwold before converting at Sculthorpe onto the de Havilland Mosquito. On 20 September 1943, 21 Squadron moved in from RAF Oulton, also with Mosquitos, to form the Sculthorpe Wing (No. 140 Wing RAF). The wing stayed at Sculthorpe, completing more than 100 missions, before departing for RAF Hunsdon in Hertfordshire on 31 December 1943.

In January 1944 100 Group RAF No. 214 Squadron RAF moved in with Boeing B-17 Flying Fortress aircraft for use in electronic warfare support of RAF Bomber Command to be joined by crews from the United States Army Air Forces (USAAF) 96th Bomb Group from RAF Snetterton Heath, known at Sculthorpe and thereafter as the 803rd Bomb Squadron of the USAAF. In April 1944 the 803rd and 214 Squadron departed for RAF Oulton leaving Sculthorpe empty for its redevelopment as a "very heavy bomber base" with the work not being completed until the spring of 1946.

A number of units were also posted here:
 No. 11 Heavy Glider Maintenance Section
 No. 140 Airfield
 No. 1699 (Fortress Training) Flight RAF
 Mosquito Conversion Flight RAF

Cold War

Sculthorpe was refurbished for USAF use during the Berlin Crisis in 1949 and then later, in 1952, it became home for the 49th Air Division (Operational) and the 47th Bombardment Wing, who were to stay for a decade. The 49th Air Division maintained operational control of the 47th Bomb WG and the 20th Fighter-Bomber Wing which provided tactical nuclear weapons support to the Supreme Allied Commander Europe (SACEUR). Later the 81st Fighter-Bomber Wing was provided a nuclear capability and assigned to the operational control of the 49th Air Division.

The Soviet Union's enormous conventional force in eastern Europe posed a major problem for NATO due to the Soviets maintaining high personnel levels after World War II when most of the American and British forces had demobilized.

To counter this Soviet threat to Western Europe, NATO decided to expand their tactical nuclear force by introducing the North American B-45 Tornado to the UK. The U.S. Tactical Air Command had about 100 of these four-engine jet bombers, each capable of dropping five tactical nuclear bombs. In the summer of 1952, the Pentagon decided to deploy the 47th Bomb Wing to Sculthorpe from Langley Air Force Base, Virginia. The movement of the 49th AD, 47 Bomb Wg and the 20th FB WG was the first unit deployment since World War II.

The squadrons of the 47th Bomb WG were:
 84th Bombardment Squadron (B-45, B-66) (17 November 1952 – 22 June 1962) 
 85th Bombardment Squadron (B-45, B-66) (17 November 1952 – 22 June 1962)
 420th Air Refueling Squadron (KB-29, KB-50) (25 September 1955 – 23 March 1962)
 86th Bombardment Squadron (B-45, B-66) (23 March 1954 – 22 June 1962)
 19th Tactical Reconnaissance Squadron (RB-45C) (7 May 1954 – 1 December 1958)

Due to a shortage of space at Sculthorpe, the 86th BS operated from RAF Alconbury as a detachment of the 47th. In addition to the B-45 squadrons at Sculthorpe, the 47th's sister wing, the 20th Fighter-Bomber Wing with the nuclear capable North American F-84G "Thunderjet" were transferred to RAF Wethersfield in Essex.

From 1954 to 1958, the 19th Tactical Reconnaissance Squadron also flew the reconnaissance version of the B-45 known as the RB-45. The 19th TRS was assigned to the 47th Bomb Wing from May 1954 to December 1958. When the 19th began to re-equip with RB-66's in 1957, its RB-45's were transferred to other squadrons of the 47th Bomb Wing.

By 1957, hosting 10,000 personnel it was the biggest USAFE base in Europe. In May 1958, the re-equipping of the 47th Bombardment Wing began and Douglas B-66 Destroyers began to replace the B-45s. With this equipment change, the 47th's squadrons were redesignated "Bombardment Squadron (Tactical)".

During 1960–1962 the 47th performed air refueling missions assigning Boeing KB-50J tankers to the 420th Air Refueling Squadron from 15 March 1960 to 22 June 1962. The KB-50s were specially equipped with two General Electric J47 turbojet engines that enabled the tankers to match the speed of the faster jet fighters during refueling; however most of the KB-50s were more than fifteen years old and were too slow to refuel the faster tactical jets of USAFE. The 420th ARS was inactivated on 25 March 1964.

In 1962 Project Clearwater halted large scale rotational bomber deployments to Britain with Sculthorpe, along with RAF Fairford, RAF Chelveston, and RAF Greenham Common, being turned over to USAFE for tactical air use. As a result, the 47th Bomb Wing was inactivated on 22 June 1962. A number of the aircraft were reassigned to the 42nd TRS, 10th Tactical Reconnaissance Wing at RAF Chelveston and modified with the electronic counter-measures tail system. With the inactivation of the 47th, Sculthorpe was put under the command of the 7375th Combat Support Group, the 7375th was later replaced by the Detachment 1, 48th Tactical Fighter Wing.

In 1979 Handley Page Victor aerial tankers from 55 & 57 Squadrons and Canberra target towing aircraft of 100 Squadron operated from Sculthorpe when the runway at RAF Marham was re-surfaced.

In spring 1982 units from RAF Coltishall in the eastern Norfolk moved to Sculthorpe while the Coltishall runway was resurfaced.

During the spring and summer of 1983, units of the 48th Tactical Fighter Wing deployed to RAF Sculthorpe because their home station, RAF Lakenheath was having its runway resurfaced.

During the summer of 1984 the F-4E and F-4G Phantom squadrons from Spangdahlem Air Base, West Germany, operated from RAF Sculthorpe to allow runway re-surfacing at Spangdahlem to take place.

During most of 1988 and part of 1989, deploying C-130 Hercules units from the 463rd Tactical Airlift Wing (Dyess AFB, Texas), the 314th TAW (Little Rock AFB, Arkansas), and the 317th TAW (Pope AFB, North Carolina) were forced to operate from RAF Sculthorpe due to runway resurfacing at RAF Mildenhall.

In August 1989 the Lockheed TR-1A squadron from RAF Alconbury operated from RAF Sculthorpe whilst Alconbury's runway was re-surfaced.

The airfield became inactive at the end of the Cold War; an end-of-use date of 2 October 1992 is quoted.

Post RAF use 
The airfield, now known as the Sculthorpe Training Area, is retained by the Ministry of Defence and forms part of the Defence Training Estate. During 2016, it was used by the USAF 352nd SOG, based at RAF Mildenhall, to perform training in low flying, airdrops, and rescue and recovery missions. These exercises were conducted by MC-130 Hercules and CV-22 Ospreys.

During the mid-1990s the entire technical and domestic site was sold to Roger Byron-Collins' Welbeck Estate Group by Defence Estates. The domestic married quarters site included a number of single storey "tobacco houses". The housing estate was renamed "Wicken Village" and, after refurbishment, the houses were sold. The remaining technical site including barrack blocks, post exchange (PX), church, guardroom, gymnasium, community centres, and extensive storage and industrial units were sold to a single purchaser and there is now a fledgling industrial park. The Welbeck Estate Group went on to acquire the nearby technical and married quarters estate at RAF West Raynham.

The only military buildings that remain are the control tower, the fire station (next to the control tower), and a small half-moon concrete shelter, now used by a farmer for machinery and equipment storage.

RAF Sculthorpe Heritage Centre opened in a room at Green Park Rural Centre, Wicken Green, in August 2019. It features many Sculthorpe-related items, and has parts of a Douglas RB-66 Destroyer including its Allison J71 jet engine which is the only known surviving example in the country.

As of w/c 21 February, they are starting demolition of the Control Tower. The Fire Station is to be retained, for USAF use.

Queen Elizabeth II made a private visit to the centre and met with the Curator and volunteers in February 2022.

See also
 List of Royal Air Force stations
 United States Air Forces in Europe
 United States Air Force in the United Kingdom
 Strategic Air Command in the United Kingdom

Notes

References

 Ravenstein, Charles A., Air Force Combat Wings Lineage and Honors Histories 1947-1977, Office of Air Force History, 1984
 Endicott, Judy G., USAF Active Flying, Space, and Missile Squadrons as of 1 October 1995. Office of Air Force History
 Menard, David W., Before Centuries. USAFE Fighters 1948-1959
 Martin, Patrick, Tail Code: The Complete History of USAF Tactical Aircraft Tail Code Markings, 1994
 USAAS-USAAC-USAAF-USAF Aircraft Serial Numbers – 1908 to present

External links

 RAF Sculthorpe Heritage Centre
 Sculthorpe at the American Air Museum – 1940s plans and aerial photos
 47th Bombardment Wing
 420th Refueling Squadron, archived in July 2008

Installations of the Ministry of Defence (United Kingdom)
Military training facilities